Tuqaq is described as the father of Seljuq, the founder of the eponymous dynasty, in the Maliknamah tradition.

Sources

Maliknamah 
The Maliknamah, which was drafted during the reign of Tuqaq's great-great-grand-son Alp Arslan (r. 1063-1072) from oral lores, was perhaps the only significant text to document the earliest history of Seljuqs and Tuqaq, in particular. The relevant information was obtained from Amir Inanj Beg, a clan-elder with extensive knowledge of genealogies. Though Maliknamah is not extant, extracts concerning our subject survive in a few works — al-Kāmil fit-Tārīkh by Ibn al-Athir [1231 CE], Aḵbār al-Dawlat al-Saljūqīya by Ibn Husayni [early 13th c], Chronicon Syriacum by Bar Hebraeus [mid 13th c.], and Rawżat aṣ-ṣafāʾ by Mirkhvand [late 15th c.] Besides, Ibn al-Adim's Bughyat al-Talab fī Tārīkh Ḥalab quotes Beg directly and was likely derived from Maliknamah.

Saljuq-nama 
Saljuq-nama — dedicated to Toghrul III — drafted in 1175, note Seljuq to be the son of Luqman; neither is Tuqaq mentioned nor is any detail provided about Luqman. The many histories that derive from the Saljuq-nama reproduce the genealogy. Some historians assert Luqman to be a misreading of Tuqaq; however, it might be that its author Zahir al-Din Nishapuri had intended to allude to the eponymous Koranic sage than any historical persona.

Others 
Ibn Hassul — who served as the secretary of Tughril (r. 1037 - 1063) and whose epistle pre-dated the Maliknamah — discusses early Seljuqid history but does not mention Tuqaq; however, he ascribes the conflict alluded to Tuqaq in Maliknama, with most of its details, to Seljuq. Jirjis al-Makin Ibn al-'Amid's al-Majmu` al-Mubarak described Tuqaq in the context of early Seljuqid history but does not cite any source.

Ethno-political affiliations 
The Seljuqs (and thus, Tuqaq) are traditionally traced to the Qiniq sub-tribe of the Oghuz Turks. However, the Maliknama tradition describes Tuqaq as a Khazar Turk; whether this is a faithful depiction of historical reality or an attempt by the Seljuqs to cast links with the illustrious Khazar Empire remains debatable. Clifford Edmund Bosworth leans in favor of the latter while A. C. S. Peacock leans against, arguing that the empire carried little prestige in the Arabic world to warrant the production of fabricated connections in the eleventh century.

Biography 

Mirkhvand quotes from the Maliknamah in the fullest extent: Tuqaq was the Chief Counsel of "the King (Yabghu) of Khazars". He carried the sobriquet Temuryaligh (lit. Iron Bow), and was the father of Seljuq. Tuqaq gained repute among the local nobility, mostly composed of Turks, after objecting to the Yabghu's decision to raid other innocent Turk tribes; even after assaulting the Yabghu with a mace and toppling him from his horse in the course of his dissent, he escaped from being punished since the nobles did not consent to have him killed. Tuqaq and the Yabghu buried their differences soon; he would die, years later, while accompanying the Yabghu in a military mission.  

Hebraeus name-drops Tuqaq as Seljuq's father; he is simply noted to have been an excellent warrior in service of the Khakans of Khazar. al-Adim notes Beg to have held Tuqaq as the father of Seljuq, and a noble of the Khajar Turks. Accounts by Ibn Husayni as well as al-Athir not only mention Tuqaq as Seljuq's father but also describe the conflict, though altering key details. In their account, Amir Tuqaq had objected to the Yabghu of Turks raiding Islamic lands. Also, after the faceoff, the court nobles played no significant role and did not come in the aid of Tuqaq. It is likely that both Husayni and al-Athir were sourcing from a variant edition of the Maliknamah, that was perhaps circulated by the Seljuqs themselves, to embed themselves within a framework of Islamic piety.

Legacy 
After his death, Seljuq became a subasy before breaking away to form a polity of his own.

See also 
 Turkic people
 Oghuz Turks
 Seljuq bey
 Seljuq dynasty
 Turkomans

Notes

References

Bibliography
 
 
 
 
 
 
 
 

Seljuk rulers
Khazar military history
900s deaths
Year of birth unknown
Year of death uncertain